Lise Lavallée (born March 4, 1957) is a Canadian politician.  She was the member of the Quebec National Assembly for the Coalition Avenir Québec in the riding of Repentigny, having been elected in the 2014 and 2018 Quebec elections, not re-offering in 2022.

Political career
Lavallée joined the Coalition Avenir Québec (CAQ) at the time of its founding in 2011.  She was elected as a member of the National Assembly in 2014 for the CAQ when she defeated the incumbent in Repentigny, Scott McKay of the Parti Québécois.

Personal life
Lavallée has lived in the city of Repentigny since 1970. Prior to her election to the provincial legislature in 2014, she was a civil law notary and legal advisor in private practice. She is a member of the chamber of commerce for L'Assomption Regional County Municipality, where from 2011 to 2013 she served on the chamber's committee for women in business, and later on the committee for business development and local purchasing.

Electoral record

References

External links

Living people
Coalition Avenir Québec MNAs
People from Repentigny, Quebec
Quebec notaries
Université du Québec à Montréal alumni
Women MNAs in Quebec
21st-century Canadian politicians
21st-century Canadian women politicians
1957 births